Sulița is a commune in Botoșani County, Western Moldavia, Romania. It is composed of three villages: Cheliș, Dracșani and Sulița.

Natives
 Cleopa Ilie

References

Communes in Botoșani County
Localities in Western Moldavia